John McArthur may also refer to:
John McArthur (footballer) (born 1938), Australian rules player
John McArthur (general) (1826–1906), Union general during the American Civil War
John McArthur (Royal Navy officer) (1755–1840), British naval officer and author
John McArthur (rugby league) (born 1964), Australian rugby league footballer
John McArthur Jr. (1823–1890), American architect
J. D. McArthur (John Duncan McArthur, 1854–1927), Canadian industrialist and railway builder
John G. McArthur, New Zealand diplomat, see list of ambassadors of New Zealand
John A. McArthur, New Zealand diplomat and eldest son of John G. McArthur, see list of ambassadors of New Zealand
John H. McArthur (1934–2019), Dean Emeritus, Harvard Business School
John Peter McArthur (1862–1942), Canadian politician from Alberta

See also 
 John MacArthur (disambiguation)